Göydəlləkli (also, Gey-Dellekli and Gëydellyakli) is a village and municipality in the Agsu Rayon of Azerbaijan.  It has a population of 557. It has a semi-arid climate prevailing, with limited rainfall. The highest average temperature is observed in July at 36°C and the coldest is 8°C in January.

References 

Populated places in Agsu District